Richard Lassey Agbenyefia is a Ghanaian politician who was the member of parliament for the Keta constituency from 2005 to 2017.

Early life and education 
Richard was born on 19 August 1968. He hails from Keta, a town in the Volta Region of Ghana. He obtained his LLB from University of Ghana in 1997 and his BL from Ghana School of Law in 1999.

Career 
He is a lawyer. He was the managing partner of Belorm Legal Consult in Accra.

Politics 
He is a member of the National Democratic Congress. He was the member of parliament for Keta Constituency in the Volta region of Ghana.

Personal life 
He is married with three children. He is a member of the Catholic Church.

References 

Living people
Ghanaian Roman Catholics
21st-century Ghanaian lawyers
Ghanaian MPs 2005–2009
Ghanaian MPs 2009–2013
Ghanaian MPs 2013–2017
People from Volta Region
1968 births
University of Ghana alumni
Ghana School of Law alumni
National Democratic Congress (Ghana) politicians